The 1960 Delaware State Hornets football team represented Delaware State College—now known as Delaware State University—as a member of the Central Intercollegiate Athletic Association (CIAA) in the 1960 NCAA College Division football season. Led by coach Roy D. Moore in his first season, the Hornets compiled a 4–4 record, outscoring their opponents 134 to 80.

Schedule

Notes

References

Delaware State
Delaware State Hornets football seasons
Delaware State Hornets football